Major Alfred Bennett Bamford (1857 – 21 October 1939) was an English watercolour painter, known for pictures of Essex.

Life
Bamford was born in Romford in 1857. He studied at the private Heatherley School of Art.
He was a prolific artist who donated a large quantity of paintings into public ownership on condition that they were displayed. In 1930 when he moved to Cheshire he gave 150 paintings to Romford.

Bamford had been a member of a local voluntary regiment. By 1897 he was an honorary Major. During World War I he was in charge of some prisoners near Chelmsford.

Bamford has a small number of paintings in important public collections.

References

External links
Alfred who? The prolific Essex artist you’ve never heard of

1857 births
1939 deaths
People from Romford
British male painters
19th-century British painters
20th-century British painters
19th-century British male artists
20th-century British male artists